Tomiyama may refer to:

Places
Tomiyama, Aichi
Tomiyama, Chiba

People
Haruo Tomiyama (1935–2016), Japanese photographer
Hideaki Tomiyama (born 1957), Japanese wrestler
Kantaro Tomiyama (born 1954), Japanese CEO
Kei Tomiyama (1938–1995), Japanese actor, voice actor and narrator
Shōgo Tomiyama (born 1952), Japanese writer and producer
Takamitsu Tomiyama (born 1990), Japanese footballer
Tatsuyuki Tomiyama (born 1982), Japanese footballer

Japanese-language surnames